Srbinovo is a village in the municipality of Gostivar, North Macedonia. Its FIPS code was MK94.

Demographics
As of the 2021 census, Srbinovo had 317 residents with the following ethnic composition:
Albanians 270
Persons for whom data are taken from administrative sources 47

According to the 2002 census, the village had a total of 1,179 inhabitants. Ethnic groups in the village include:

Albanians 1,179

References

External links

Villages in Gostivar Municipality
Albanian communities in North Macedonia